Mohammed Abdulla Jumaa Alqubaisi (Arabic: محمد عبدالله جمعة القبيسي) is a UAE National and also the Chairman of Finance House, a UAE finance company headquartered in Abu Dhabi.

Early Life

He graduated from the University of Texas, Austin with a Bachelor of Science in Computer Engineering.

Professional career

Alqubaisi was for 5 years the Deputy Chief Executive Officer of Abu Dhabi Islamic Bank, the UAE’s largest Islamic Bank at the time. Before that, he was employed at the National Bank of Abu Dhabi (NBAD) for 10 years and headed the Domestic, International and Capital Markets operations.

In addition, he was on the Board of several leading institutions such as Visa International, Abu Dhabi Securities Exchange, and Qatar Telecom among others.

Alqubaisi was an innovator in UAE Capital Markets overseeing the UAE stock market at NBAD (prior to the establishment of official stock exchanges) and was involved with most Initial Public Offerings of UAE companies since 1993.

Corporate Social Responsibility

Since the year 2005 and up until this day, Alqubaisi aimed through his institutions to create and take part in corporate social responsibility programs such as blood donations, charitable institution donations, Earth Hour initiatives, support programs, and government contributions to help in the fight against the pandemic.

Awards

•2013 - "Lifetime Achievement Award” as recognition for his achievements in the financial industry within the UAE

References

Living people
People from Dubai
Emirati businesspeople
Year of birth missing (living people)